Ekazhevo (Ekažaqongiy-Yurt; Эккажакъонгий-Юрт, Ekkažaqongiy-Yurt) is a rural locality (a selo) in Nazranovsky District of the Republic of Ingushetia, Russia. It forms the municipality of the rural settlement of Ekazhevo as the only settlement in its composition.

Geography 
The capital of the republic, Magas, is located 2 km south of the village, the village of Surkhakhi is 4 km southeast, in the upper reaches of the Konch river.

History 

The earliest archaeological sites found in the vicinity of the village of Ekazhevo date back to the Mousterian era in Ingushetia. There is also the "Ekazhevsky settlement" related to the Kuro-Araxes culture (Bronze Age).

Also, the village of Ekazhevo is included in the zone of one of the largest groups of archaeological sites (including Alanian settlements), where, according to some researchers, the medieval Magas, the capital of the Alanian state, which included the territory of modern Ingushetia, could be located.

To date, directly in the village of Ekazhevo, archaeologists have recorded: on the eastern outskirts of the village — "Ekazhevsky settlement No. 1 Achamza-boarz" ("Acham-boarz"); 50 m from the settlement "Achamza-boarz" — "Ekazhevsky settlement No. 2"; 2.5 km northeast of the village — "Ekazhevsky settlement No. 3".

The village of Ekazhevo (Ekažaqongiy-Yurt) is translated literally as "the village of the sons of Ekazh", the first settlers of which were representatives of the Ekazhev family, says Ph.D. Alimbek Kurkiev in the book "On some toponymic names of planar Ingushetia".

From 1944 to 1958, during the period of the deportation of Chechens and Ingush and the abolition of the Chechen-Ingush Autonomous Soviet Socialist Republic, the village was called Novo-Ardonskoye (Novoardonskoye, Novy Ardon).

At various times, such terrorist leaders as Shamil Basayev and Said Buryatsky were killed in the village itself and in its environs. The special operation carried out in the village was the subject of a number of extensive articles in the human rights press in Russia and the CIS.

Infrastructure 
There are 6 comprehensive schools in Ekazhevo. The largest potato farm in the republic.

Notable people 
 Issa Kostoyev — State Counselor of Justice 2nd class, investigator, known for the capture of the serial killer Andrei Chikatilo.
  — police colonel, Hero of the Russian Federation
  — abrek, national hero of the Ingush.

References

Bibliography 
 
 
 
 
 
 

Rural localities in Ingushetia